Rasmus Ludwig Emanuel Tirzitis (born 31 July 1986) is a Swedish film director and editor from Trångsund, Stockholm. He is best known as the director and producer of Star Wars: Threads of Destiny which is a fan film, created by fans of George Lucas' Star Wars saga.

Tirzitis graduated from the Stockholm Film School in Stockholm in 2008.

He has both directed and edited directorial debut Vilsen (2016). His second film The Huntress: Rune of the Dead (2019) was a co-production between Sweden and the company ITN Distribution, Las Vegas, Nevada, USA. The screenplay for the film was written by Tirzitis together with Faravid Af Ugglas.

His production company is Tirzitis Entertainment.

Filmography

References

External links
 
 

Living people
1986 births